Sixten Sandberg is a retired Swedish footballer. Sandberg made 17 Allsvenskan appearances for Djurgården and scored 5 goals.

References

Swedish footballers
Allsvenskan players
Djurgårdens IF Fotboll players
Association footballers not categorized by position